Robert J. Vancrum (born December 2, 1946) is an American former politician and attorney who served in the Kansas House of Representatives and Kansas State Senate.

Vancrum was elected to the Kansas House in 1980, taking office in January 1981. He served six terms in the House, and was elected to the Kansas State Senate in 1992, where he served one term before being succeeded by Keith Schraad.

Vancrum works as an attorney in Overland Park, Kansas.

References

1946 births
Living people
Republican Party Kansas state senators
Republican Party members of the Kansas House of Representatives
20th-century American politicians
Politicians from Overland Park, Kansas
People from El Dorado, Kansas